Marika Holland is a scientist at the National Center for Atmospheric Research known for her work on modeling sea ice and its role in the global climate.

Education and career 
Holland has a B.A. and a Ph.D. (1997) from the University of Colorado Boulder. Following her Ph.D. Holland was a postdoctoral fellow at the University of Victoria until 1999 when she joined the staff at the National Center for Atmospheric Research (NCAR). Holland was Chief Scientist for the Community Earth System Model (CESM) from 2012 until 2014 and received the CESM Distinguished Achievement Award for her work in 2014.

Research 
Holland is known for her research predicting sea ice on different time scales. Holland's modeling of sea ice began with considerations of the processes that define the actions of sea ice in climate models. In 2003, Holland and Celia Bitz modeled how changes in the Arctic climate alter the degree of polar amplification in climate models. Holland's work on future sea ice predict an ice-free Arctic Ocean by 2040, research that was broadly covered in the news. Research by Holland and others then showed that sea ice was declining faster than the predictions. Holland has also worked with biologists to assess how changes in sea ice impact Emperor penguins and Adelie penguins. Holland has been a contributing author on the third, fourth, and fifth assessment reports from the Intergovernmental Panel on Climate Change. In 2020 Holland was named an elected fellow of the American Geophysical Union who cited her "for sustained contributions in polar research and climate modeling".

Selected publications

Awards and honors 
Kavli Frontiers of Science Fellow, National Academy of Sciences (2002, 2006)
CESM Distinguished Achievement Award (2014)
Fellow, American Geophysical Union (2020)
IASC medal, International Arctic Science Committee (2019)
Fellow, American Meteorological Society (2021)

References

External links 

 May 31, 2019

Fellows of the American Geophysical Union
Intergovernmental Panel on Climate Change contributing authors
University of Colorado Boulder alumni
National Center for Atmospheric Research faculty
Women climatologists
Year of birth missing (living people)
Living people